Demon is an American supernatural action comic by Jason Shiga. The comic, which follows a man who apparently cannot die, was self-published from 2014 to 2016 as a mini-comic and webcomic, then released as a four-volume 720-page graphic novel by First Second Books in 2016 and 2017. It was unusually well-organized for a webcomic, having been entirely written and laid out before release, with a well-founded story, consistent art, and daily updates.

The comic was received favourably by critics, who praised the clever story and its puzzles and plot twists, the artwork which balanced the often grim subject matter, and the surprising humor. The comic won an Eisner Award and an Ignatz Award.

Plot 

Jimmy Yee repeatedly kills himself and reawakens at a motel. The police misidentify him and suspect him of murdering motel guests. Jimmy concludes that he is a "demon", and that each time he died his mind possessed the closest person.

Agent Hunter of the OSS takes custody of Jimmy. Jimmy provokes a suicide by cop and uses possessions to attack Hunter, but is overpowered. Hunter locks fatally injured Jimmy in a supermax prison death row to possess the neighbouring inmate. Jimmy improvises a weapon and suicides through dozens of condemned prisoners until he reaches a guard and escapes.

Jimmy plans to kill an imprisoned drunk driver to avenge his family. The OSS set a trap, but both parties are surprised that Jimmy's 10-year-old daughter, Sweet Pea, is a demon possessing the brain-damaged drunk driver. Jimmy kills his way through the agents and escapes reinforcements. He threatens to destroy the OSS if Sweet Pea is not brought to him. Hunter attempts another trap, but Jimmy kills the entire group and reunites with Sweet Pea. However, Hunter tricks Jimmy into making a disadvantageous possession, capturing him.

It is explained that the OSS planned to make demons to replace hostile dictators with US puppets. However, project leader Dr. Gellman used the demonizer on himself then killed his coworkers. Jimmy is offered a pardon to kill Gellman, who they say plans to attack the US. Jimmy agrees, but goes rogue and provokes a military response to destroy the OSS base. Everyone inside is killed, with Sweet Pea possessing her way out. Jimmy decides that they should quietly outlive any remaining adversaries.

After 90 years, Jimmy contacts Gellman. On meeting, Gellman immediately kills himself, ending his long life (as the next-closest person is Jimmy, another demon who cannot be possessed).

Another 100 years pass. Jimmy is now older than Gellman and bored with life, feeling that the best is behind him. Jimmy unexpectedly walks into a trap by Hunter, who had demonized himself before the lab was destroyed. Following an extended fight and chase, during which Jimmy phones Sweet Pea to warn her, Hunter executes Jimmy.

The OSS backtrace Jimmy to Sweet Pea and imprison her at Osaka Castle, with a bizarre arrangement of adversaries to create obstacles for demon possession. Hunter plans to harvest Sweet Pea's blood over several months to make a demon army and replace world leaders. Six months later he executes her for sending secret messages and harvests her remaining blood to complete his army.

Jimmy finds himself conscious but sense-deprived. He reasons that he possessed an unborn fetus. Later, Jimmy is born, possesses an adult, and sends a message for Sweet Pea.

Seven months earlier, Sweet Pea receives Jimmy's warning that Hunter is still alive. She faces a dilemma: the only way to locate Hunter is to be captured, but if she is captured she will not be able to fight Hunter. She recollects that each possession creates a parallel world where the suicide attempt failed, a certain fourth-dimensional distance apart. Sweet Pea possesses an astronaut and suicides in outer space, where the next-closest human is the same astronaut in the parallel universe. She goes to that universe's Earth and finds its Sweet Pea. One of them becomes captured while the other receives the prisoner's messages and plans an attack. Months later, the free Sweet Pea receives Jimmy's message and they reunite.

Sweet Pea declares victory but they both find life boring and decide to stop Hunter. They spend a month training, then create hundreds of duplicates using the entire human presence in space. Hours before Hunter's scheduled world coup, they launch their attack, with high casualties on both sides. The castle gate becomes a killing zone and Hunter releases failsafes, killing friend and foe. Jimmy directly engages and overpowers Hunter, who orders the lab guards to reinforce him. Distracted, Jimmy is captured by Hunter.

Hunter wants Jimmy to witness his victory, but Sweet Pea has taken over the lab – their actual goal – and exsanguinated a hundred duplicates for the demonizer's range to engulf the entire Earth, demonizing every human. Hunter's agents kill themselves in the planned coup but there is no one left to possess. Hunter's last failsafes kill everyone at the castle and lab.

Far away, one Jimmy and Sweet Pea watch news reports of the events. With everyone a demon and no one to possess, they are all equal and mortal. Sweet Pea is upset as this reality weighs on her. Jimmy recalls that Gellman said there was another way to make a possession, and considers the challenge of becoming a good person.

Development 

Cartoonist Jason Shiga began working on Demon in 2010 when he had finished his previous title, Empire State. His earlier attempts at creating an epic work had both failed, and Shiga stated that his biggest obstacle to creating Demon was "figuring out  to do it". [emphasis in original]

He usually spends as much time planning a book as he does drawing it, and it took him about three years to write and pencil 720 pages for Demon. With the puzzles and mathematics in his stories, Shiga wrote from the ending and worked backwards. He felt that he would "get completely lost and fizzle out otherwise." Shiga described the story as "a 3 player chess match that pivots into a series of 7 concentric escape puzzles [with] the chess match itself contained in 2 more layers of puzzles." Shiga sketched the sequence of scenes in reverse as well, and this technique made him focus more on story than characterizations. Shiga cut some story arcs while thumbnailing, and rewrote the last chapter twice.

Shiga stated that the biggest influences on Demon were Quantum Leap, Groundhog Day and Memoirs of an Invisible Man. Quantum Leap was his favourite television show and inspired the possessions in the series, although he disliked that the leaps required performing good deeds. He was similarly disappointed with how good deeds broke the loop in Groundhog Day, feeling that there was no logic to it. Shiga was also inspired by MacGyver for using intelligence to overcome obstacles with minimal resources and by Death Note in which two brilliant minds compete for advantage.

The improvised weapon used to escape the prison was based on a real incident in Japan. The final showdown at Osaka Castle was inspired by Shiga's visit there on his honeymoon. He was particularly influenced by an artist's interpretation of the Siege of Osaka in isometric perspective.

Shiga placed great importance on negative space in the layouts to control the pacing. The final art was inked in sequence with coloring done in Photoshop. Although many reviewers have noted that Shiga's simple artistic style contrasts with the wild plots, making them more palatable, Shiga has stated that he did not consciously do this and is critical of his artistic skill, feeling that it is a professional shortcoming. He stated that he tried to make the scenes "tastefully depicted" given the material.

Publication history 

In 2013, Shiga submitted Demon to Abrams Books, which was publishing his previous title Empire State. It was reasonably rejected, Shiga later noted, due to his "crazy list of demands". However, at the time, Shiga became intransigent on the format and subject matter, and decided to self-publish. Being solely responsible for production encouraged Shiga to "try every crazy idea I could get away with" – including issues of 4 pages, 60 pages, and one in which every panel was black.

Shiga initially released Demon as a mini-comic, which was a familiar format for him. He printed 400 copies of each issue on a Risograph printer, and mailed them out, believing that this would be its final form.

Shiga had been skeptical about webcomics; as an afterthought he put some pages on his website in January 2014, where it gathered a larger following. He decided to continue posting the webcomic as issues of the mini-comic were released. Having it all mapped out made Demon unusually organized for a webcomic, and allowed him to publish 7 pages per week and to also have a completion bar indicating the comic's progress toward conclusion. Shiga improvised a little while inking the mini-comic and webcomic, adding to some arcs and cutting others. This resulted in an additional 15 pages compared to his penciled manuscript.

He became an early adopter of Patreon and was receiving $2000 a month by the completion of the webcomic on 23 May 2016. The earnings and readership convinced publishers that Demon was a marketable title. Shiga received offers and signed with First Second Books.

The 21-issue comic was repackaged as a four-part graphic novel (released in four-month intervals during 2016 and 2017) with only small changes to the original material. Shiga stated that it split easily into four parts, though he had wanted a single 720-page edition.

Narrative and themes 

Demon is a supernatural action series. Shiga states that Demon is a homage to old superhero comics and to 1990s alternative comics.

In science-fiction magazine Locus, Shiga wrote that, for himself, the series was primarily "a story of a man obsessed with the application of logic and science to a seemingly inexplicable supernatural phenomenon."  He likened Jimmy's path, from the squalid motel to a palace, to humanity's progress through the cumulative benefits of science and technology. Jimmy uses his reasoning and abundance of time to become the most powerful human in existence.

Shiga stated that immortality and the stability that comes from it allowed examination of what gives meaning to the life of the characters. As a nihilist, Shiga feels that there is no meaning to anything.

Reception

Critical response 

Writing on the initial instalments of the webcomic in 2014, Rob Clough of The Comics Journal noted how Shiga's background in pure mathematics influences the presentation of his stories as "problems waiting to be solved". He described the webcomic as "a rapidly escalating supernatural action series" which takes as its central theme the implicit nihilism of Shiga's previous works. Clough praised the "clockwork intricacy" of the plot and the simple lines of the art, with red shades the only coloring, lending well to the "surprisingly visceral and fluid" action scenes.

Dustin Cabeal of Comic Bastards found the plot to be compelling and well-planned, with artwork that conveyed the characters' emotions. He noted it was remarkable how Shiga's writing normalized the carefree violence for which Demon is known, and personally found a great deal of humour in the material that might shock other readers. He found the artwork consistent throughout the series, described as "simplistic and yet complex" and likened to an 8-bit video game. Cabreal included the title on his Best of 2016 list. Cabeal felt the gag humour had lost its impact by the end of the series, but that the story remained compelling and that Demon was unlike anything else he had ever read.

In a review for the New York Journal of Books, Jake Bible called Demon "hilarious, sick, violent, disturbing [and] brilliant". He found that Shiga's simple artistic style, devoid of unnecessary details, complemented the "absurdity and humor" of the story. He recommended it to those who like "over the top violence mixed with sharp humor and tight storytelling".

Paste magazine included Demon on its list of the 12 most-ludicrous comic premises in history. The publication's Sean Edgar wrote that the series stood apart from "murder buffet" titles by its "equally brutal math and nihilism" with "unapologetic intelligence".

Paul Lai of Multiversity Comics called the series "offbeat hilarious, gloriously crude, and surprisingly touching". Ziah Grace of ComicsAlliance wrote that Demon is unique and unpredictable, its long and intricate story arcs balanced with artwork that allows it to retain its humor. Jason Sacks of Comics Bulletin declared Demon as among "the most outrageously delightful comics to appear in years".

Chris Mautner of The Smart Set wrote that the series brings together elements of mystery, twisted dark humor, and extreme action honed in Shiga's earlier works. He found the narrative consumed with structure and rules, putting Jimmy into dire situations to think his way out – usually involving unrepentant mayhem. He likened the series to manga Death Note for its extreme anti-hero, stubborn antagonist, deadly puzzles, and game-changing plot twists. Mautner felt that the series would not have worked so well without its humor and cartoonish art style, which made its darker aspects more palatable.

A review in Publishers Weekly described the writing as "tight and tense", juxtaposed by Shiga's spartan "clip art" style. Graeme McMillan of The Hollywood Reporter noted that the series remained fresh due to its sweeping plot twists which cause sudden reversals for the characters. Booklist called the series "smart, bizarre, and irreverent", with a high-stakes plot where the body count was matched by the crude humor.

The A.V. Club described Demon as having a simple premise which permitted the delivery of "gore, viscera, and rapid-fire carnage".  The reviewers felt that the simplicity of the art, with characters drawn to the point of abstraction, made the panels instantly understandable, speeding the pace of reading, and also added to the explosive moments of violence, in which gore is shown in depth and color contrasting with the paper-doll bodies. They found it to be a compelling read with a blend of formalism and simplicity, "result[ing in] something goofy, funny, harrowing and exciting".

Nominations and awards 

|-
! scope="row" | 2017
| Best Graphic Album — Reprint
| Eisner Awards
| 
| 
| 
|-
! scope="row" | 2016
| Graphic Novel
| Los Angeles Times Book Prize
| 
| 
| 
|-
! scope="row" | 2016
| Outstanding Series
| Ignatz Award
| 
| 
| 
|-
! scope="row" | 2014
| Outstanding Series
| Ignatz Award
| 
| 
| 
|-
! scope="row" | 2014
| Outstanding Online Comic
| Ignatz Award
| 
| 
|

Footnotes

Notes

References

External links 
Official website

2010s webcomics
2014 webcomic debuts
2016 webcomic endings
Webcomics in print
First Second Books books
American webcomics
Action webcomics
Supernatural fiction
Fiction about body swapping
Eisner Award winners for Best Graphic Album: Reprint
Ignatz Award winners for Outstanding Series